Fairmont is a city in and county seat of Marion County, West Virginia, United States. The population was 18,313 at the 2020 census. It is the principal city of the Fairmont micropolitan area, which includes all of Marion County in North Central West Virginia, and is the second-largest city of the larger Morgantown–Fairmont combined statistical area.

History

Beginnings 
In the eighteenth century, the earliest development of Fairmont consisted of subsistence farming settlements. 

In 1789, Boaz Fleming, a Revolutionary War veteran, migrated to western Virginia and purchased a 254-acre farm from Jonathan Bozarth. In 1808, Fleming made his annual trek to Clarksburg to pay his brother's Harrison County taxes. While in Clarksburg, Fleming attended a social gathering that included his cousin Dolley Madison, wife of President James Madison. Fleming complained to Mrs. Madison about having to travel over a hundred miles each year from his home to pay his Monongalia County taxes and his brother's Harrison County taxes. Mrs. Madison supposedly suggested that he create his own county to save him all that travel. In 1814, Fleming circulated a petition to do precisely that, naming the proposed county Madison County in honor of Dolley and James Madison.

Milford, now Rivesville, was the only town within the borders of Fleming's proposed county, so Fleming decided to make Milford the seat of Madison County. However, Milford's citizens preferred to remain part of Monongalia County. As a result, Fleming's petition failed to gain sufficient support to be presented to the Virginia General Assembly. Fleming then focused on creating a new town near his farm, which was located on the west side of the Monongahela River. In 1817, Fleming's sons—William and David—began to clear land on a part of their father's farm to make way for the new town; this part of the farm would later become downtown Fairmont.

1819 to present 

In 1819, Fairmont was founded as Middletown, Virginia. It was named Middletown because either it was in the middle of two cities, Morgantown and Clarksburg, or Fleming's first wife, Elizabeth Hutchinson, was originally from Middletown, Delaware. That same year, a road was built between those two cities. Fleming's new town was about halfway between the two cities, which made it a resting point. The town was incorporated as Middletown on January 19, 1820.

The current borders of Marion County were established in 1842, and Middletown was named the county's seat. At that time, William Haymond Jr. suggested that the town's name be changed to Fairmont because the town had a beautiful overlook of the Monongahela River, giving it a "fair mount". The Borough of Fairmont was incorporated in 1843 by the Virginia General Assembly.

In 1863, during the American Civil War, Confederate General William E. Jones and his men raided Fairmont and cut the Union's supply lines to take food and horses. They also burned the books from the personal library of Governor Francis Harrison Pierpont.

Many of the first buildings in Fairmont were poorly constructed. By 1852—little more than 30 years after the city's founding—a large portion of Fairmont was reported to be run-down and dilapidated. Reports from 1873 indicate that these buildings had continued to fall into disrepair. On April 2, 1876, a fire destroyed a large portion of the city's business district, as well as many houses in the area. The continuing dilapidation of the city's buildings may have contributed to the fire; the large number of coal mines under Fairmont may have also played a role.

Between 1891 and 1901—in a span of only 10 years—Fairmont's population had increased from 1,000 to 7,000. The City of Fairmont was chartered in 1899; as a result of the charter, the city absorbed the surrounding towns of Palatine (also known as East Side) and West Fairmont. By 1901, Fairmont was an important commercial center. Many railroads—including the Baltimore and Ohio Railroad on its way from Cumberland, Maryland to Wheeling—traveled through the city. By this time, Fairmont was also the leading center of the coal trade industry in northern West Virginia, employing some 10,000 workers in the coal mines around Fairmont.

By 1978, an issue with Fairmont's land experiencing subsidence appeared because the remains of Fairmont's 19th-century coal mines were crumbling. As a result, over the following years, the federal government along with other institutions spent money to fix the subsidence issue to prevent damage to the town.

Geography
The Tygart Valley River and the West Fork River join in Fairmont to form the Monongahela River. Buffalo Creek, a tributary of the Monongahela River, flows through the northern part of the city.

Climate
Fairmont has a humid continental climate (Köppen Dfa) with very warm summers and freezing winters. However, it is not uncommon during winter for warm air from the Gulf of Mexico to raise temperatures above , which occurs on average six times each January and over eight in December and February. Despite the abundant precipitation throughout the year, the relative dryness of cold air means that most precipitation is rain even during the winter: the most snowfall in a month being  is November 1950, and the most in a season  between July 1950 and June 1951. The hottest temperature has been  on August 8, 1918, and the coldest  on January 21, 1994.

Demographics

2020 census 
As of the 2020 census, there were 18,416 people and 7,903 households residing in the city. There were 9,045 housing units in Fairmont. The racial makeup of the city was 84.2% White, 7.3% African American, 0.6% Asian, 0.3% Native American, 0.5% from other races, and 7% from two or more races. Hispanics or Latinos of any race were 2.2% of the population.

There were 7,903 households, of which  37.1% were married couples living together, 30.6% had a female householder with no spouse present, 23% had a male householder with no spouse present. The average household and family size was 2.83. The median age in the city was 34.4 years. With 18.3% of the city being under 18. The median household income in the city was $47,618 and the poverty rate was 19.9%.

2010 census
At the 2010 census, there were 18,704 people, 8,133 households and 4,424 families living in the city. The racial makeup of the city was 88.9% White, 7.5% African American, 0.2% Native American, 0.6% Asian, 0.4% from other races, and 2.3% from two or more races. Hispanic or Latino of any race were 1.4% of the population.

There were 8,133 households, of which 24.1% had children under the age of 18 living with them, 37.7% were married couples living together, 12.5% had a female householder with no husband present, 4.2% had a male householder with no wife present, and 45.6% were non-families. 36.0% of all households were made up of individuals, and 14.1% had someone living alone who was 65 years of age or older. The average household size was 2.16 and the average family size was 2.83.

The median age was 36.8 years. 18% of residents were under the age of 18; 16.2% were between the ages of 18 and 24; 25% were from 25 to 44; 24.4% were from 45 to 64; and 16.5% were 65 years of age or older. The gender makeup of the city was 48.2% male and 51.8% female.

2000 census
At the 2000 census, there were 19,097 people, 8,447 households and 4,671 families living in the city. The population density was 2,438.5 per square mile (941.7/km2). There were 9,755 housing units at an average density of 1,245.6 per square mile (481.0/km2). The racial makeup of the city was 90.16% White, 7.26% African American, 0.26% Native American, 0.61% Asian, 0.02% Pacific Islander, 0.20% from other races, and 1.49% from two or more races. Hispanic or Latino of any race were 0.82% of the population.

There were 8,447 households, of which 21.4% had children under the age of 18 living with them, 40.2% were married couples living together, 11.7% had a female householder with no husband present, and 44.7% were non-families. 36.4% of all households were made up of individuals, and 16.8% had someone living alone who was 65 years of age or older. The average household size was 2.16 and the average family size was 2.83.

18.4% of the population were under the age of 18, 14.9% from 18 to 24, 24.1% from 25 to 44, 22.2% from 45 to 64, and 20.4% who were 65 years of age or older. The median age was 39 years. For every 100 females, there were 87.0 males. For every 100 females age 18 and over, there were 83.3 males.

The median household income was $25,628 and the median family income was $37,126. Males had a median income of $27,944 and females $20,401. The per capita income was $16,062. About 12.6% of families and 20.1% of the population were below the poverty line, including 22.0% of those under age 18 and 9.7% of those age 65 or over.

Arts and culture

Fairmont is home to Country Club Bakery, which is where the pepperoni roll snack originates. The bakery continues to serve the roll along with their various other baked goods.  Fairmont has considered itself to be the "pepperoni roll capital of the world".

Landmarks
 Fairmont's National White Collar Crime Center provides nationwide support to law enforcement agencies involved in prevention, investigation, and prosecution of economic and high-tech crime.
 NASA Independent Verification and Validation Facility, governed by the Goddard Space Flight Center, houses more than 150 full-time employees and more than 20 in-house partners and contractors.
 NOAA Robert H. Mollohan Research Facility, which receives weather data from the Geostationary Operational Environmental Satellites and houses more than 100 full-time employees.
 The Jacobs-Hutchinson Block building, also known as Peoples' National Bank and Friendly Furniture Store

Government

Fairmont has a Council-manager government, whereby the mayor serves as chairman of the city council and the city manager takes care of the day-to-day operations.  The current mayor is Thomas Mainella  and the current city manager is Valerie Means.

City council
Josh Rice, District 1
Term expires: 2022

Anne Bolyard, District 2
Term expires: 2024

Karl "David" Kennedy, District 3
Term expires: 2022

Richard "Rick" Garcia, District 4
Term expires: 2024

Barry Bledsoe, District 5
Term expires: 2022

Gia Deasy, District 6
Term expires: 2024

Nick "Nicky" Cinalli, District 7
Term expires: 2022

Thomas Mainella, Mayor, District 8
Term expires: 2022

Donna Blood, Deputy Mayor, District 9
Term expires: 2022

Past mayors

 William Elza Arnett, 1906–1908
 Matthew M. Neely, 1908–1910
 William Conaway
 A.C. West
 Fred T. Wilson, 1935–1940
 Fred T. Wilson, 1944–1945
 Albert F. Robertson, 1947–1950
 James H. Hanway, 1951–1955
 William G. Meyer, 1959
 Forrest L. Springer
 Albert F. Robinson
 J. Richard Davis
 William M. Hawkins
 James L. Turner, 1979
 Robert K. Powell, 1980
 James L. Turner, 1981
 Robert K. Powell, 1982
 Gregory T. Hinton, 1982-1984
 Robert M. Drummond Sr., 1984–1985
 Carl J. Snyder, 1985–1986
 Robert M. Drummond Jr., 1986–1990
 Wayne A. Stutler, 1990–1994
 Charles G. Manly II, 1994–1996
 Nick L. Fantasia, 1996–2006
 S. Scott Sears, 2007–2009
 Matt Delligatti, 2009–2010
 Bill Burdick, 2011–2012
 Ronald J. Straight Sr. 2013–2016
 Thomas Mainella, 2017–2019
 Brad Merrifield, 2019–2020
 Thomas Mainella, 2021-present

Education

Fairmont Senior High School
Fairmont Senior High School is a public high school that is listed on the National Register of Historic Places. The school was established in the late 1800s, and the school was relocated in 1905 and 1928. The current iteration of the school, which is located on Loop Park Dr, was designed by the architect William B. Ittner.

Fairmont State University
Fairmont State University is a public university with an approximate enrollment of 3,800 students. The institution offers master's degrees in business, education, teaching, criminal justice, and nursing, in addition to 90 baccalaureate and 50 associate degrees.
Originally established as a school for teachers, the college was named Fairmont Normal School, and was located on the corner of Fairmont Avenue and Second Street and moved to its present location in 1917.

Dunbar School 

Dunbar School is a historic building in Fairmont, West Virginia, that used to be an all-black high school. The school was designed by the architect William B Ittner. The school was built in 1928.

Infrastructure

Highways
Fairmont is located in the North-Central region of the state, along West Virginia's I-79 High Tech Corridor. Major highways include:

  Interstate 79
  U.S. Highway 19
  U.S. Highway 250
  West Virginia Route 310
  West Virginia Route 273

Airports
Fairmont Municipal Airport (Frankman Field) is a public use airport located two nautical miles (4 km) southwest of the central business district of Fairmont. It is owned by the Fairmont-Marion County Regional Airport Authority.

Notable people

 Tony Adamle, played in NFL for Cleveland Browns (1947–1951, 1954)
 Max Balchowsky, prominent 1950s and 1960s American race car builder and driver.
 Frank J. Breth, United States Marine Corps brigadier general
 David Carpenter, professional baseball player, Atlanta Braves, New York Yankees
 Joe Cerisano, singer, songwriter, musician ("Be All That You Can Be", "Hands Across America")
 Augusta Clark, librarian, politician and lawyer; second African-American woman on Philadelphia City Council (1980-2000)
 Ann K. Covington, former chief justice of Supreme Court of Missouri, first woman to hold that position
 Frank Kendall Everest Jr.,  U.S. Air Force officer best remembered as aeroengineer and test pilot during 1950s; once known as "Fastest Man Alive"
 Ron Everhart, assistant basketball coach West Virginia University, head coach at Duquesne, Northeastern and McNeese State
 Art Finley, North American television and radio personality, mostly in San Francisco and Vancouver, remembered by many as "Mayor Art", host of children's show aired on KRON-TV in San Francisco from 1959 to 1966
 Aretas B. Fleming, 8th Governor of West Virginia
 Carrie Watson Fleming, First Lady of West Virginia, 1890–1893
 Frank Cruise Haymond, Judge of West Virginia Supreme Court of Appeals, 1945-1972
 Thomas Haymond, 19th Century congressman and lawyer
 Philip C. Jimeno, member of Maryland State Legislature
 Johnnie Johnson, piano player and blues musician, member of Rock and Roll Hall of Fame
 Rashod Kent, NFL player
 Fuzzy Knight, film and television actor, appeared in over 180 films between 1929 and 1967, usually as a cowboy hero's sidekick
 John Knowles, author of A Separate Peace
 Alan Mollohan, U.S. Representative from West Virginia's 1st District
Stephen Montague, classical composer, lived in Fairmont as a child from 1952 to 1957
 Luella Mundel, professor and McCarthyism victim
 Michael Oliverio II, member of state senate, representing 13th District
 Francis H. Pierpont, Governor of union controlled parts of Virginia during American Civil War, known as  "father of West Virginia"
 Doris Piserchia, science fiction writer
Raphiael Putney (born 1990), basketball player for Maccabi Haifa of the Israeli National League
 Mary Lou Retton, gymnast, 1984 Olympic gold medalist, member of President's Council on Physical Fitness and Sports
 George S. Roberts, combat fighter pilot with the Tuskegee Airmen
 Nick Saban, current head coach of the Alabama Crimson Tide football team of the University of Alabama.
Dante Stills, American football defensive lineman for the West Virginia Mountaineers
Darius Stills, American football defensive tackle for the West Virginia Mountaineers
 Robert Tinnell, screenwriter, director, producer, author of comic books and graphic novels
 Clarence Wayland Watson, founded several companies that became Consolidation Coal and Mining Companies, was U.S. Senator from West Virginia from 1911 to 1913
 Hershel W. Williams, awarded Medal of Honor for his outstanding heroism in Battle of Iwo Jima

See also
 Fairmont Marion County Transit Authority

References

External links

 City of Fairmont website

 
Cities in West Virginia
County seats in West Virginia
Micropolitan areas of West Virginia
Cities in Marion County, West Virginia
West Virginia populated places on the Monongahela River